Excise stamps of Ukraine are a kind of Ukrainian revenue stamps to collect excise tax. They are used in accordance with the Ukraine's presidential decree of 18 September 1995, "On approval of the excise duty on alcoholic beverages and tobacco products".

On 24 October 1996, there was another decree of the Cabinet of Ministers of Ukraine, "On approval of the production, storage and sale of excise stamps and marking of alcoholic beverages and tobacco products, and the sale or destruction of the confiscated alcoholic beverages and tobacco products". It introduced excise stamps into circulation in Ukraine.

The law was amended by later decrees of the Ukrainian Government.

See also

References 

Ukraine
Excises
Government finances in Ukraine
Customs services
1996 introductions